Amsterdam After Dark is an album by the American jazz saxophonist George Coleman recorded in late 1978 and released on the Dutch label, Timeless.

Reception

Michael G. Nastos of AllMusic simply states, "Legendary tenor saxophonist blows up a storm with the Hilton Ruiz Trio".

Track listing
All compositions by George Coleman except as indicated
 "Amsterdam After Dark" – 8:29
 "New Arrival" (Hilton Ruiz) – 7:21
 "Lo-Joe" – 5:00
 "Autumn in New York" (Vernon Duke) – 10:16
 "Apache Dance" – 7:49
 "Blondie’s Waltz – 5:50

Personnel
George Coleman – tenor saxophone
Hilton Ruiz – piano
Sam Jones – bass
Billy Higgins – drums

References

George Coleman albums
1979 albums
Timeless Records albums